Pran of Albania is a children's historical novel by Elizabeth Miller. Set in the early nineteenth century among the mountain tribes of northern Albania, it tells the story of a fourteen-year-old girl, Pran, who, by tribal tradition, is old enough to be betrothed. To avoid an arranged marriage, she follows local custom in taking a vow to be a "sworn virgin" and to live as a man.  The novel, illustrated by Maud and Miska Petersham, was first published in 1929 and was a Newbery Honor recipient in 1930.

References

See also
Albanian sworn virgins

1929 American novels
Children's historical novels
American children's novels
Newbery Honor-winning works
Novels set in Albania
Novels set in the 19th century
1929 children's books